Dead to Rights II is a neo-noir third-person action video game developed by Widescreen Games, published by Namco, and released in 2005. It is a prequel to  Dead to Rights. A prequel to Dead to Rights II for the PlayStation Portable, titled Dead to Rights: Reckoning, was released in June 2005.

Plot
A reputable judge Alfred McGuffin uncovers a citywide crime syndicate, and is kidnapped. The judge was a friend of Jack's father, so the cop is obligated to send a few hundred men to their graves in order to make things right. Before long, all hell breaks loose, so Jack and his K-9 cohort Shadow must take on a powerful mob in the fight of their lives to break the city's spiral of betrayal and corruption. In the end, the judge is murdered and although Jack gets the killer, goons of a high-ranking Russian crime lord named Blanchov get the judge's files. Jack's girlfriend Ruby is murdered by Blanchov and although Jack never retrieves the files (they were likely Hennesey's files from the first game), he goes after Blanchov for revenge.  Jack kills Blanchov, but gets no satisfaction out of it knowing that Blanchov is just a highly placed puppet that can easily be replaced.  Having lost Ruby, Jack has nothing to really live for anymore. Also he claims that who has him Dead to Rights as they got the files and he ended up with nothing.

Reception

The PlayStation 2 and Xbox versions received "mixed" reviews according to video game review aggregator Metacritic.

References

External links
 

2005 video games
Action video games
Namco beat 'em ups
Organized crime video games
PlayStation 2 games
Third-person shooters
Video game prequels
Video games about police officers
Video games developed in France
Video games scored by James Dooley (composer)
Windows games
Xbox games
RenderWare games
Single-player video games